Rhabdophis murudensis, the Muruden keelback or Gunung Murud keelback, is a keelback snake in the family Colubridae found in Malaysia,.

References

Rhabdophis
Snakes of Southeast Asia
Reptiles of Malaysia
Reptiles described in 1925
Taxa named by Malcolm Arthur Smith
Reptiles of Borneo